Avatha novoguineana  is a species of moth of the family Erebidae. It is found on New Guinea and Cape York, Australia.

The wingspan is about 40 mm.

References

External links
Australian Caterpillars

Moths described in 1906
Avatha
Moths of New Guinea
Moths of Australia